François Toussaint Gros (in classical Occitan Francés Totsant Gròs) was an Occitan-language writer from Provence.

Biography 
Gros was born in Marseille and studied to be a priest, however he was never ordained. He was a friend of Marquise Pauline de Simiane (grand daughter of Madame de Sévigné). He lived in Paris for a time where he got married and had children and finally settled in Lyon where he obtained the administrative charge of fermier and where he died.

External links
 Recuil de pouesiés prouvençalos, 1763 edition.
 Complete work, 1841.

Writers from Marseille
Occitan-language writers
18th-century French writers